Dalton James Patrick McGuinty (August 13, 1926 – March 16, 1990) was a Canadian politician from Ontario. A member of the Ontario Liberal Party, he was elected to the Legislative Assembly of Ontario from 1987 to 1990. He represented the riding of Ottawa South. He had 10 children,  including Dalton McGuinty who was Premier of Ontario from 2003 to 2013, and David McGuinty who has been a member of the House of Commons of the Parliament of Canada since 2004.

Background 
McGuinty was born in Osceola, Ontario, to Charles McGuinty and Dora (Foley). The family later moved to Ottawa, Ontario. He was educated at Colgate University in Hamilton, New York, the University of Ottawa and Harvard Business School. He worked as professor of English at the University of Ottawa and served as a separate school trustee on the Ottawa Board of Education from 1972 to the end of 1986. His position as a separate school trustee ended in December 1986 when full funding for separate schools was implemented.

He was married to a nurse, Elizabeth Pexton, with whom he had six sons and four daughters. Two of his sons were notable politicians in their own right – former Premier of Ontario, Dalton McGuinty, and David McGuinty, a member of the House of Commons of the Parliament of Canada.

Politics 
He was elected to the Ontario legislature in the 1987 provincial election, easily defeating his Progressive Conservative opponent in the constituency of Ottawa South.  He served as a backbench supporter of David Peterson's government. From 1988 to 1989 he served as Parliamentary Assistant to the Minister of Skills Development.

He died on March 16, 1990, after suffering a heart attack while shoveling snow in his driveway. He was 63 years old.

His son, Dalton Jr., said his father entered politics because be believed he could do something for the average person. He said his father was interested in environmental and educational issues and taking care of seniors.

References

External links 
 

1926 births
1990 deaths
Canadian business theorists
Canadian people of Irish descent
Colgate University alumni
Harvard Business School alumni
Ontario Liberal Party MPPs
People from Renfrew County
Politicians from Ottawa
University of Ottawa alumni
Academic staff of the University of Ottawa
20th-century Canadian economists
Ontario school board trustees